Asphodelus ayardii is a species of asphodel found in North Africa and the Middle East.

References

Asphodeloideae
Flora of North Africa